The Simple Life of Noah Dearborn, is a 1999 American television film aired on 9 May 1999 on CBS. It stars Sidney Poitier as the eponymous rural Georgia skilled carpenter, who lives alone without electricity and seems frozen in time.  George Newbern played a developer trying to force Dearborn off his land. He tries to enlist the help of his psychologist girlfriend (Mary-Louise Parker), a move which backfires badly. The developer tries to have Dearborn declared mentally incompetent; the effort fails, mostly because of the efforts of the woman, who realizes why Dearborn is held in esteem by his neighbors. For her performance, Dianne Wiest was nominated for a Primetime Emmy Award for Outstanding Supporting Actress - Miniseries or a Movie. Poitier retired from acting and died in 2022.

References

External links 
 
 

1999 television films
1999 films
CBS network films
Trimark Pictures films
Films directed by Gregg Champion